Joseph Lawrence Bowman ( – 15 August 1779) was an American frontiersmen and military officer who fought during the American Revolutionary War. He was second-in-command during Colonel George Rogers Clark's 1778 military expedition to capture the Illinois Country, in which Clark and his men seized the key British-controlled towns of Kaskaskia, Cahokia, and Vincennes. Following the 1779 campaign and defeat of the British forces, Bowman was critically injured in an accidental gunpowder explosion and subsequently died of his wounds. He was the only American officer killed during the 1778-1779 Illinois campaign. Joseph Bowman kept a daily journal of his trek from Kaskaskia to Vincennes, which is one of the best primary source accounts of Clark's victorious campaign.

Early life
Joseph Bowman was born in Frederick County, Virginia, the son of George Bowman and Mary Hite. Their names were Anglicized from their original German names, Hans Georg Baumann and Marie Elisabetha Hite. His maternal grandfather was Jost Hite, a German immigrant credited as the first white, European colonist to settle west of the Blue Ridge Mountains of Virginia. In 1732, Hite led his extended family, including his daughter Mary and her husband, George Bowman, to the Shenandoah Valley, near present-day Winchester, Frederick County, Virginia. Jost Hite distributed land that he owned to his family and to other settlers—claims, which would later be contested in Hite v. Fairfax, a landmark Virginia land case.

In 1774, Joseph Bowman served in the Virginia colonial militia during Lord Dunmore's War. Other Virginians, who served with him in the war, included George Rogers Clark and Leonard Helm.  A year later, Bowman moved to Kentucky with other British colonists who were seeking available land on the western frontier.  In 1776, Bowman was among the petitioners in Harrodsburg, Kentucky seeking to establish a new county. On September 11, 1777, thirty-seven men from the area gathered at Bowman's property to shell corn and were attacked by Indians. One white settler was killed and six others were wounded before the Indians were driven off.

Revolutionary War service
Joseph Bowman and three of his brothers served in the American Revolutionary War. Bowman is sometimes confused with his brother, Colonel John Bowman, a prominent leader of the Kentucky frontier settlements of the Virginia State Forces during the war.

In early 1778, Colonel George Rogers Clark offered Bowman a commission if he could raise his own company. Captain Bowman assembled his company and joined the rest of Clark's force on 12 May 1778, and was part of Clark's campaign.  Bowman was present at the capture of Fort Gage in Kaskaskia, on 4 July 1778. Bowman later moved north, leading a non-uniformed, combined force of Virginian, local Illinois Country, and French-Canadian's to capture Prairie du Rocher and Cahokia Fort de Chartres and Cahokia, where Bowman remained for a time as the commanding officer of the renamed Fort Bowman.

When Fort Sackville, renamed Fort Patrick Henry and Captain Leonard Helm, was captured by British Lt-Governor Henry "Hair Buyer" Hamilton in late 1778, Captain Bowman marched with Colonel Clark in February 1779 across  to lay siege to the British forces at Vincennes. Bowman also participated in the negotiations for their surrender. After the British surrender, the American flag was raised and the fort was renamed Fort Patrick Henry, on February 24, 1779.  
Within days, a dispatch from the Governor of Virginia arrived, with commissions promoting Clark to general, and Bowman to major.

Death
In celebration of the end of General Clark's Illinois campaign, a six-pounder cannon was fired on February 25, 1779. During the cannon salute, some of the artillery gunpowder charges accidentally ignited, wounding Captain Edward Worthington, four privates, a captured British soldier, and critically wounding Captain Bowman. Oddly enough, General Clark made no mention of the tragic cannon accident in his memoir, however, Clark does describe Major Bowman leading soldiers, as late as June 1779. Due to the severe burn wounds he received, the health of Major Bowman deteriorated, causing him to die at Fort Patrick Henry on 14 August 1779. The last page of his journal is blank, except for an anonymous notation: "God save the [Virginia] commonwealth, this 15th day of August, 1779."  A bronze grave marker with the date of 18 August 1779 was later, placed in the St. Francis Xavier Cemetery, adjacent to the George Rogers Clark National Historical Park, Vincennes, Knox County, Indiana, though he was buried somewhere along the Wabash River.

Notes

References
Butterfield, Consul Willshire. History of George Rogers Clark's Conquest of the Illinois and the Wabash Towns, 1778 and 1779. Columbus, Ohio: Heer, 1904.
English, William Hayden.  Conquest of the Country Northwest of the River Ohio 1778-1783 and Life of Gen. George Rogers Clark Vol I.  ©1896.  The Bowen-Merrill Company.  Indianapolis, Ind., and Kansas City, Mo.
Harrison, Lowell H. George Rogers Clark and the War in the West. Lexington: University Press of Kentucky, 1976; Reprinted 2001, .

External links
Online memorial to Joseph Bowman by the Indiana SAR.
Online excerpts from Joseph Bowman's journal, courtesy of the Indiana State Library.
"The Forgotten Long Knife", article about Bowman from the Early American Review, 2003.
"Fort Bowman", historical marker near the house where Joseph Bowman was born.
"A Virginian, A Tomahawk, & The American Revolution In The Old West", article regarding Bowman's interactions with Native Americans

1752 births
1779 deaths
American Revolutionary War deaths
American Revolutionary War Diarists
Joseph
Burials in Indiana
Illinois in the American Revolution
Indiana in the American Revolution
Kentucky pioneers
People from Shenandoah County, Virginia
People of Kentucky in the American Revolution
People in Dunmore's War
Virginia colonial people
Virginia militiamen in the American Revolution